= Liputa =

Women's fashion

Liputa is a style of wearing modern fashion by women in Democratic Republic of the Congo and the Republic of Congo. "Liputa" means wearing of colorful materials in style. Usually Congolese women wear fashion of very vibrant colours. Congolese women wear their attire to a marriage ceremony, market, gathering or to a formal party in Liputa style. Mothers who have young children usually use a similar material to carry their baby at the back. This is seen as the norm in the DRC.

== Draping Method ==
The attire consists of four pieces made from the same material. One piece is worn as a blouse, one as a wrapper, one to tie on the waist, and another one to tie on the head. The blouse has a big-cut neck and big arm sleeves. One piece of material is wrapped around from the waist to feet to cover the legs. Another piece ties the waist to tighten the wrapper and keep it in place. It also signifies whether the woman is married or unmarried. This piece ties in such a way that the knot looks like a huge beautiful bow on the waist. The last piece is tied on the head as a turban to cover the hair. Now-a-days they do not tie their hair with the turban or leave the hair loose even if tying the turban. The blouse usually has embroidery with colourful threads and decorative beads around the neck. The neck is big, so that the head can easily fit through the blouse. Traditionally buttons are not used, however sometimes buttons can be used to decorate the blouse.

== Speciality ==
Materials here are 100% cotton. Dyeing is the main method of coloring cloth. Usually indigo is used to colour the material.
